Moreno Aoas Vidal or simply Moreno (born February 23, 1983, in São Paulo), is a Brazilian left back who plays for Uberlândia.

Moreno was signed for Udinese in January 2008.
 He previously played for Botafogo, signed a 6-month contract in June 2007.

In January 2009 he left for Eupen on loan. In June 2009 he was released by Udinese.

In February 2010, he signed a 1-year contract with Guarani.

In international level, he played for Brazil at 2003 Pan American Games.

Honours
Tournament Rio - São Paulo: 2002
Brazilian Cup: 2002
São Paulo State League: 2003
Ceará State League: 2007

External links
 
 zerozero.pt
 globoesporte
 Profile at Lega-calcio.it

References

1983 births
Living people
Footballers from São Paulo
Brazilian footballers
Brazilian expatriate footballers
Expatriate footballers in Switzerland
Expatriate footballers in Italy
Sport Club Corinthians Paulista players
FC Chiasso players
Club Athletico Paranaense players
Santa Cruz Futebol Clube players
Fortaleza Esporte Clube players
Botafogo de Futebol e Regatas players
Udinese Calcio players
Guarani FC players
Clube Atlético Bragantino players
Uberlândia Esporte Clube players
Association football defenders
Pan American Games medalists in football
Pan American Games silver medalists for Brazil
Footballers at the 2003 Pan American Games
Medalists at the 2003 Pan American Games